Emmanuel Arewan Omodiagbe (born October 19, 1985) is a Nigerian football offensive allrounder currently playing for Nigerian club Warri Wolves F.C.

Career 
In January 2006 he moved from Bendel Insurance F.C. to Heartland F.C. On 26 February 2009 with teammate Kabiru Alausa he joined CSKA Sofia where he was on trial with the club. However, the transfer fell through due to problems with the fee and the agent's share, so he returned to the Naze Millionaires. He joined Warri Wolves at the start of the 2010–11 season.

References 

1985 births
Living people
Igbo sportspeople
Nigerian footballers
Association football midfielders
Heartland F.C. players
Bendel Insurance F.C. players